Denver Airport is a commuter rail station on the A Line in Denver, Colorado, serving the Denver International Airport. The A Line begins at the airport and travels west to Union Station in Downtown Denver in about 27 minutes via six intermediate stops. Trains run about every 15 minutes.

History 
The original 1989 master plan for the Denver International Airport called for a transit line to be built to the airport, and the main terminal (named the Jeppesen Terminal) was designed to accommodate the eventual construction. RTD first studied how to build a train to Denver International Airport in 1997, but it wasn't until the FasTracks transit expansion package was approved in November 2004 that RTD had the money to construct the  line. The project was selected to be constructed and operated by Eagle P3, a public-private partnership. The station opened along with the rest of the A Line on April 22, 2016.

The two tracks and island platform at Denver Airport station are not aligned in the middle of the right-of-way to accommodate future expansion. However, as of February 2022, there has been no word of any such proposal.

The station was designed by the architecture firm Gensler, which also designed the 519-room Westin hotel which was built above and straddling the station. The hotel opened on November 25, 2015. The project also included an 82,000 square-foot, open-air plaza and achieved a LEED Platinum rating.

Station layout 
In addition to the two-track island platform for A Line trains, the station also includes several bus gates, which are served by RTD's airport express bus service called SkyRide. SkyRide route AB operates between Boulder and the airport, while route AT operates between Arapahoe at Village Center station, Nine Mile station, and the airport. The bus gates are also used by RTD route 104L, a limited-stop bus with hourly service to Thornton and two commuter routes with just a few runs per day: RTD route 145X to Brighton and 169L to Aurora.

Reflecting the airport location, the station has several specialized amenities. To assist passengers arriving in Denver, who may not be acquainted with the RTD transit system, the station has an RTD Customer Care service desk where agents can answer questions. There are also ticket-vending machines to allow passengers to purchase a pass before boarding the A Line or RTD buses. To assist passengers departing Denver, the station includes flight information screens, airport check-in kiosks, and a baggage service desk where passengers may deposit their checked baggage before entering the airport.

The station is connected to the south end of the airport's Jeppesen Terminal by a five-story escalator, the tallest in Colorado.

Public art 
The station includes several pieces of public art.

The logs on the banks of the train station are an outdoor sculpture called "Shadow Array" by Denver artist Patrick Marold. The art installation features 236 spruce logs that were killed by beetles. They are arranged to create shadows and patterns that change and shift based on the lighting in the area. The logs are also lit so the shadows can be seen at night.

Slow-moving images projected above the escalator that runs between the station and the terminal. The display was created by Paris-based light artist Yann Kersalé and is called "L’eau dans tous ses êtats" (English: Water in all of its states).

There is also what has been called an "unplanned artwork" at the train station, dozens of concrete railroad ties leftover from the construction were artfully arranged into the design of the landscaping located east of the platform, in an area designated for future expansion of the station.

References 

RTD commuter rail stations in Denver
2016 establishments in Colorado
Railway stations in the United States opened in 2016
Airport railway stations in the United States
Denver International Airport